Kaau Crater Boys were a Hawaiian Contemporary musical duo composed of Ernie Cruz Jr. (vocals, guitar, bass), Troy Fernandez (ukulele, vocals).  They recorded and released four popular Hawaiian Contemporary albums along with a "best of" compilation:

Tropical Hawaiian Day (1991)
Valley Style (1993)
On Fire (1995)
Making Waves (1996)
The Best of Kaau Crater Boys (1998)

Their work garnered them three Nā Hōkū Hanohano awards (Nā Hōkū Hanohano means "The Distinguished/Glorious Stars", Hawaii's version of the Grammy Awards) from the Hawaii Academy of Recording Arts.

History
The Kaau Crater Boys were formed in the early 1990s by Ernie Cruz Jr. (the son of Ernie Cruz Sr. and brother of Guy and John Cruz who are also local entertainers) and Troy Fernandez. According to Ernie's brother John, Troy need a job to keep him out of prison so he asked Ernie if he could be a part of his gig at Mooses Mc Gillycuddy. Ernie was reluctant at first because they knew each other's family Ernie helped Troy out. This is how the Ka'au Crater Boys was made.

Their first album, Tropical Hawaiian Day, released in 1991, marked the official beginning of Troy and Ernie’s 7-year partnership as one of the most successful groups in contemporary island music.

Cruz played bass, acoustic guitar and handled main vocals for the majority of songs they recorded. Fernandez also played bass, contributed to vocals (mainly as a backing vocalist), but was mostly renowned for his musicianship with the ukulele.

The creation of the Kaau Crater Boys also coincided with the resurgence in local Hawaiian customs and tradition, as well as promoting the renaissance of Hawaiian culture, especially among the local youth.

As part of a collective of artists from the Palolo Housing area of Oahu, Cruz and Fernandez earned a steady gig at the Elks Lodge which also opened the door for Troy and Ernie to tour Japan for 6 months.

A last minute appearance a few years later at Moose McGillycuddy’s Pub became a regular gig - this time as “E.T.,” “Ernie/Troy” (a play on names after the popular film, ET – The Extra-Terrestrial). The name Ka'au Crater Boys was actually a name that Ernie's brother John came up with years ago, Ernie asked John if he could use the name. John was hesitant at first but allowed them to use the name.  

Guy Cruz also died in September 2016; Ernie Cruz (father of Ernie Jr. and Guy) died in May 2016.

Etymology
The name Kaau Crater Boys refers to Kaau Crater, an extinct volcano above the Palolo Valley of Oahu, near to the Palolo housing community in which Cruz and Fernandez were raised.

References

External links
 Hawaii Magazine (Defective link prior to 1/10)
 Honolulu Star Bulletin
 Troy Fernandez Biography

Musical groups from Hawaii
Na Hoku Hanohano Award winners
Hawaiian ukulele players